New Kensington Production Works Historic District, also known as the New Kensington Works and Arnold Works, is a national historic district located at New Kensington, Westmoreland County, Pennsylvania. It encompasses 35 contributing vernacular industrial buildings built between about 1899 and 1947.  It was the original manufacturing plant for Alcoa and produced a wide range of aluminum products including kitchen utensils, rods, bars, wire, tubing, sheet foil, automobile parts, bronze powder, industrial chemical utensils, and beer barrels.

It was added to the National Register of Historic Places in 1998.

References

External links

Industrial buildings and structures on the National Register of Historic Places in Pennsylvania
Historic American Engineering Record in Pennsylvania
Historic districts on the National Register of Historic Places in Pennsylvania
Historic districts in Westmoreland County, Pennsylvania
New Kensington, Pennsylvania
National Register of Historic Places in Westmoreland County, Pennsylvania